Vsevolod II Olgovich (Cyrillic: Всеволод II Ольгович) (died August 1, 1146) was the Prince (Knyaz) of Chernigov (1127–1139) and Grand Prince of Kiev (Velikiy Knyaz), 1139–1146), son of Oleg Svyatoslavich, Prince of Chernigov.

Vsevolod married Maria Mstislavna of Kiev, the daughter of Grand Duke Mstislav of Kiev. They had two sons and two daughters:
 Sviatoslav III of Kiev
 Yaroslav II Vsevolodovich, born in 1139
 Anna of Chernigov, married a prince of Halych, son of Vasylko Rostyslavych according to some chronicles
 Zvenislava of Chernigov, married Boleslaw I the Tall, Duke of Wroclaw

Though he had two sons, Vsevolod's chosen successor was his brother, Igor, and he obtained pledges from his subjects to accept Igor as his heir. According to one account, Vsevolod even had the Kievans kiss the Holy Cross and swear loyalty to Igor, which they resented. Shortly before his death, Vsevolod became a monk under the name Gavriil.

Sources
 Dimnik, Martin. The Dynasty of Chernigov, 1146-1246, 2003
 Рыжов К. В. Всеволод II Ольгович // Все монархи мира. Россия. — М.: Вече, 1998. — 
 Хмыров М. Д. Всеволод II Ольгович // Алфавитно-справочный перечень государей русских и замечательнейших особ их крови. — СПб.: Тип. А. Бенке, 1870. — С. 24—25.

Princes of Chernigov
Grand Princes of Kiev
1146 deaths
Rurik dynasty
12th-century princes in Kievan Rus'
Year of birth unknown
Eastern Orthodox monarchs
Olgovichi family